The Nottingham Independents is a political party in the area of Nottingham City in Nottinghamshire, England. It was officially registered in January 2018, planning to contest elections in the area of Nottingham.  The party is now the largest opposition group in Nottingham City Council after the 2019 elections.

History

The party's first councillor wad when Sarah Hewson, elected as a Conservative to Gedling Borough Council, joined the Nottingham Independents in March 2018.

After the 2019 Nottingham City Council election the party gained 3 councillors for the Clifton East Ward, making Nottingham Independents the largest opposition party on the council.

Election results

The first by-election contested by the party was the Clifton North by-election on 27 September 2018, where the party came 3rd with 11% of the vote share. In the 2019 council elections the party put forward 7 candidates across 5 wards. The party published a city manifesto for the elections. The Nottingham Independents elected 3 councillors in the Clifton East ward, making it the biggest opposition party in the Nottingham City Council.

References

Locally based political parties in England